Antonio Meeking (born August 24, 1981) is an American former professional basketball player. He last played with Piratas de Quebradillas in Puerto Rico.

External links
 Antonio Meeking at D-league
 Antonio Meeking at Eurobasket.com
 Antonio Meeking at draftexpress.com

1981 births
Living people
ABA League players
African-American basketball players
Albuquerque Thunderbirds players
American expatriate basketball people in Germany
American expatriate basketball people in Israel
American expatriate basketball people in Mexico
American expatriate basketball people in Serbia
American expatriate basketball people in Turkey
Asheville Altitude players
Hapoel Gilboa/Afula players
Basketball players from Louisiana
Caciques de Humacao players
KK Hemofarm players
Louisiana Tech Bulldogs basketball players
People from Monroe, Louisiana
Piratas de Quebradillas players
Potros ITSON de Obregón players
Power forwards (basketball)
Reno Bighorns players
Sioux Falls Skyforce players
Skyliners Frankfurt players
American men's basketball players
21st-century African-American sportspeople
20th-century African-American people